The Terminologia Histologica (TH) is the controlled vocabulary for use in cytology and histology. In April 2011, Terminologia Histologica was published online by the Federative International Programme on Anatomical Terminologies (FIPAT), the successor of FCAT.

It was intended to replace Nomina Histologica. The Nomina Histologica was introduced in 1977, with the fourth edition of Nomina Anatomica.

It was developed by the Federative International Committee on Anatomical Terminology.

Outline
 h1.00: Cytology 
 h2.00: General histology 
 H2.00.01.0.00001: Stem cells 
 H2.00.02.0.00001: Epithelial tissue 
 H2.00.02.0.01001: Epithelial cell
 H2.00.02.0.02001: Surface epithelium
 H2.00.02.0.03001: Glandular epithelium
 H2.00.03.0.00001: Connective and supportive tissues 
 H2.00.03.0.01001: Connective tissue cells
 H2.00.03.0.02001: Extracellular matrix
 H2.00.03.0.03001: Fibres of connective tissues
 H2.00.03.1.00001: Connective tissue proper
 H2.00.03.1.01001: Ligaments
 H2.00.03.2.00001: Mucoid connective tissue; Gelatinous connective tissue
 H2.00.03.3.00001: Reticular tissue
 H2.00.03.4.00001: Adipose tissue
 H2.00.03.5.00001: Cartilage tissue
 H2.00.03.6.00001: Chondroid tissue
 H2.00.03.7.00001: Bone tissue; Osseous tissue
 H2.00.04.0.00001: Haemotolymphoid complex 
 H2.00.04.1.00001: Blood cells
 H2.00.04.1.01001: Erythrocyte; Red blood cell
 H2.00.04.1.02001: Leucocyte; White blood cell
 H2.00.04.1.03001: Platelet; Thrombocyte
 H2.00.04.2.00001: Plasma
 H2.00.04.3.00001: Blood cell production
 H2.00.04.4.00001: Postnatal sites of haematopoiesis
 H2.00.04.4.01001: Lymphoid tissue
 H2.00.05.0.00001: Muscle tissue 
 H2.00.05.1.00001: Smooth muscle tissue
 H2.00.05.2.00001: Striated muscle tissue
 H2.00.06.0.00001: Nerve tissue 
 H2.00.06.1.00001: Neuron
 H2.00.06.2.00001: Synapse
 H2.00.06.2.00001: Neuroglia
 h3.01: Bones 
 h3.02: Joints 
 h3.03: Muscles 
 h3.04: Alimentary system 
 h3.05: Respiratory system 
 h3.06: Urinary system 
 h3.07: Genital system 
 h3.08: Endocrine system 
 h3.09: Cardiovascular system 
 h3.10: Lymphoid system 
 h3.11: Nervous system 
 h3.12: The Integument

See also
 Terminologia Embryologica
 International Morphological Terminology

References

External links

 The Federative International Programme for Anatomical Terminology

Anatomical terminology
Biological nomenclature